Mangrove Creek is a suburb of the Central Coast region of New South Wales, Australia, located about  upstream and north of Spencer along the Mangrove Creek watercourse. It is part of the  local government area.

It derives its name from the waterway, which was first mentioned in 1829 by surveyor William Romaine Govett (1807–1848) in relation to mangroves in the area, which were burnt for ash which was used to make soap.

References

Suburbs of the Central Coast (New South Wales)